= Speed limits in Luxembourg =

Informational sign showing the standard speed limits for cars in Luxembourg

The general speed limits in Luxembourg are as follows:

General speed limits
Type of road	Urban	Rural	Motorway
Cars, vans and motorcycles	50 km/h (31 mph)	90 km/h (56 mph)	130 km/h (81 mph); 110 km/h (68 mph) in rain
Cars and vans with trailers	50 km/h (31 mph)	75 km/h (47 mph)	90 km/h (56 mph)
Heavy goods vehicles (over 3.5 t)	50 km/h (31 mph)	75 km/h (47 mph)	90 km/h (56 mph)
Buses	50 km/h (31 mph)	75 km/h (47 mph)	90 km/h (56 mph)
